The Etivluk River is a  tributary of the Colville River in the U.S. state of Alaska.

The river begins at Nigtun Lake and flows generally to the north-northeast before joining the Colville River. The Nigu River enters the Etivluk from the right near its headwaters, and the joined rivers are sometimes referred to as the Etivluk-Nigu River. The entire length of the Etivluk flows through a remote area of northern Alaska, entirely north of the Arctic Circle.

See also
List of rivers of Alaska

References

Rivers of North Slope Borough, Alaska
Rivers of Alaska